The Boston Junior Rangers are a Tier III Junior A ice hockey organization playing in Tewksbury, Massachusetts. The team plays in the Eastern Hockey League (EHL).

History

The initial founder and owner Mike Addesa is a former NCAA Division I ice hockey head coach at Rensselaer Polytechnic Institute. Mr. Addesa founded the team as the Boston Bulldogs playing out of Salem, Massachusetts. At the end of the 2011–12 season the franchise was sold and relocated to become the Boston Jr Rangers. In 2017, the league re-branded, dropping the Premier name from their top division and renamed the Elite Division to Premier.

The organization also operates a team in the EHL-Premier Division and numerous youth division teams. The Premier Division team was formerly in the Metropolitan Junior Hockey League (MetJHL) and won the league championship in the 2014–15 season, its last season in the league, before joining the EHL-Elite Division.

Top Tier Season-by season records

Second Tier Season-by season records

Notable alumni

The Rangers/Bulldogs have produced a number of alumni playing in higher levels of junior hockey, NCAA Division I, Division III, and ACHA college programs. 
 Joe Callahan – San Jose Sharks (NHL)
 Dave Caruso – Albany Devils (AHL)
 David Gove – Wilkes-Barre/Scranton Penguins (AHL)

References

External links
 Junior Rangers website
 EHL website

1995 establishments in Massachusetts
Ice hockey clubs established in 1995
Ice hockey teams in Massachusetts
Junior ice hockey teams in the United States
Sports in Middlesex County, Massachusetts
Tewksbury, Massachusetts